Albert Taar (born 15 January 1990) is an Estonian footballer who plays as a midfielder for FC Tallinn in IV liiga. He was the highest goalscorer for JK Narva Trans in 2013. In December 2014, he was given a four-year ban for participating in betting activities while playing football, a violation of the Estonian Football Association's rules.

Club career
Taar briefly played for Wisła Płock during the 2013–2014 season.

References

External links
 Player profile on Soccernet.ee
 

1990 births
Living people
Sportspeople from Sillamäe
Estonian footballers
Estonia under-21 international footballers
Estonia youth international footballers
FCI Levadia Tallinn players
FC Flora players
JK Sillamäe Kalev players
Viljandi JK Tulevik players
Wisła Płock players
Association football midfielders
Meistriliiga players